Clinton Collymore was the Chief Minister within the Ministry of Local Government and Regional Development in Guyana. He is a convert to Hinduism.

External links
Hindus of South America Hinduism Today - January 2000
Plaisance market among five others to be rehabilitated Government of Guyana - October 22, 2005

Converts to Hinduism
Guyanese Hindus
Living people
Year of birth missing (living people)
Place of birth missing (living people)